Filmmaker John Krasinski has received numerous awards and nominations for acting, screenwriting, producing, and directing in film, theater, television, and streaming.

Film and television industry awards

Critics' Choice Awards

Emmy Awards

Producers Guild of America Awards

Screen Actors Guild Awards

Writers Guild of America Awards

Literary awards

Hugo Award

Nebula Award

Bram Stoker Award

Theater awards

Theatre World Award

Critics awards

Australian Academy of Cinema and Television Arts Awards

African American Film Critics Association

Christopher Award

Fangoria Chainsaw Awards

Florida Film Critics Circle Awards

Georgia Film Critics Association

Hollywood Critics Association

IGN Awards

Kansas City Film Critics Circle

Los Angeles Online Film Critics Society Awards

NAACP Image Awards

National Board of Review

San Diego Film Critics Society Awards

Satellite Awards

Saturn Awards

St. Louis Film Critics Association

TV Land Award

Special recognition

Brown University

Entertainment Weekly

Media Access Awards

Smithsonian Institution

Time 100

Film festival awards

Monte-Carlo

Savannah

South by Southwest

Sundance

Other awards

People's Choice Awards

Streamy Awards

Teen Choice Awards

Webby Awards

References

Lists of awards received by American actor
Lists of awards received by film director
Lists of awards received by writer